Confederación Empresarial de Sociedades Laborales de España (CONFESAL) is a Spanish enterprise organization whose objectives are the representation and defense of the interests of companies in labor societies in Spain. CONFESAL formed on 4 July 1987.

References

External links
CONFESAL official site

Business organisations based in Spain
1987 establishments in Spain
Organizations established in 1987